Anatoly Sergeevich Chernyaev (May 26, 1921 – March 12, 2017) was a Russian historian and writer who was a principal foreign-policy advisor to General Secretary Mikhail Gorbachev during the final days of the Soviet Union.

After fighting in World War II, Chernyaev studied history at Moscow State University, where he would teach contemporary history from 1950 to 1958.  In 1961, he joined the International Department of the Central Committee of the Communist Party of the Soviet Union, where he became a senior analyst. In March 1976, he was promoted to Central Auditing Commission of the Communist Party of the Soviet Union. He became General Secretary Gorbachev's foreign-policy advisor in 1986 and continued to advise Gorbachev when the latter became President of the Soviet Union.

In 2004, Chernyaev donated his diaries from the Gorbachev period to the National Security Archive at George Washington University, which has published portions of them in English translation; according to the editor, "One can confidently say that every bold foreign policy initiative advanced by Gorbachev in the years 1985-1991 bears Chernyaev's mark on it."

Since then, the National Security Archive has made Chernyaev's diaries available from 1972 to 1981 and 1985 to the fall of the Soviet Union in 1991. English translations of the original documents are available as pdf files. The diaries from 1982 to 1984 are still expected in coming years.

References 

1921 births
2017 deaths
Soviet politicians
20th-century Russian historians
Central Committee of the Communist Party of the Soviet Union members